The Eneti was a people that inhabited a region close to Paphlagonia, mentioned by Homer and Strabo.

 Homer's (  850 BC) Iliad. In Book II, Homer says that the ἐνετοί (Enetoi) inhabited Paphlagonia on the southern coast of the Black Sea in the time of the  Trojan War (c. 1200 BC). The Paphlagonians are listed among the allies of the Trojans in the war, where their king Pylaemenes and his son Harpalion perished.
Strabo mentioned that the inhabitants had disappeared by his time.

References

See also
Paphlagonia

Paphlagonia
Ancient history of Turkey